Ringwould with Kingsdown is a coastal civil parish in the Dover District of Kent, England. The parish contains the villages of Ringwould and Kingsdown.

The A258 Sandwich to Dover road runs through the parish.

Parishes surrounding Ringwould with Kingsdown are Walmer at the north; Ripple at the west; Langdon at the south-west; and St Margaret's at Cliffe at the south. The coastal east of the parish is against the English Channel.

At the south-east of the parish, and against the coast, is Walmer and Kingsdown Golf Course.

References

External links

Civil parishes in Kent
Dover District